Buchholz's psi-functions are a hierarchy of single-argument ordinal functions  introduced by German mathematician Wilfried Buchholz in 1986. These functions are a simplified version of the -functions, but nevertheless have the same strength as those. Later on this approach was extended by Jäger and Schütte.

Definition 

Buchholz defined his functions as follows. Define:
Ωξ = ωξ if ξ > 0, Ω0 = 1
The functions ψv(α) for α an ordinal, v an ordinal at most ω, are defined by induction on α as follows: 
ψv(α) is the smallest ordinal not in Cv(α)
where Cv(α) is the smallest set such that 
Cv(α) contains all ordinals less than Ωv 
Cv(α) is closed under ordinal addition
Cv(α) is closed under the functions ψu (for u≤ω) applied to arguments less than α.

The limit of this notation is the Takeuti–Feferman–Buchholz ordinal.

Properties 

Let  be the class of additively principal ordinals. Buchholz showed following properties of this functions:

Fundamental sequences and normal form for Buchholz's function

Normal form 

The normal form for 0 is 0.

Fundamental sequences 

The fundamental sequence for an ordinal number  with cofinality  is a strictly increasing sequence  with length  and with limit , where  is the -th element of this sequence. If  is a successor ordinal then  and the fundamental sequence has only one element . If  is a limit ordinal then .

For nonzero ordinals , written in normal form, fundamental sequences are defined as follows:

If  where  then  and 
If  and  then  and  where .

Explanation 

Buchholz is working in Zermelo–Fraenkel set theory, that means every ordinal  is equal to set .

The condition  means that set  includes:

all ordinals from previous set ,
 all ordinals that can be obtained by summation the additively principal ordinals from previous set ,

That is why we can rewrite this condition as:

 

Then  is the smallest ordinal that does not belong to this set.

Examples

Consider the following examples:

 

  (since no functions  and 0 + 0 = 0).

Then .

 includes  and all possible sums of natural numbers and therefore  – first transfinite ordinal, which is greater than all natural numbers by its definition.

 includes  and all possible sums of them and therefore .

 the second epsilon number,

, where  denotes the Veblen's function,

, where  denotes the Feferman's function,

  is the Ackermann ordinal,

  is the small Veblen ordinal,

  is the large Veblen ordinal,

 

Now let's research how  works:

 

 i.e. includes all countable ordinals. And therefore  includes all possible sums of all countable ordinals and  first uncountable ordinal which is greater than all countable ordinal by its definition i.e. smallest number with cardinality .

 

 

 

 

  where  is a natural number,

 

For case  the set  includes functions  with all arguments less than  i.e. such arguments as 

and then

 

In the general case:

 

We also can write:

Ordinal notation 

Buchholz defined an ordinal notation  associated to the  function.

 ,
 .
 .
 .

Every term is either , a principal term or a braced array of principal terms of length . By convention, every term can be uniquely expressed as either  or a braced, non-empty array of principal terms.

 
 
 If , then:
 
 
 
 

Although  itself is not a well-ordering, its restriction to a recursive subset , which will be described later, forms a well-ordering. In order to define , we define a subset  for each  in the following way:

 
 
 

Finally, we define a subset  in the following way:

 

We can then define a map  in the following way:

 

Buchholz verified the following properties of :

 For any  satisfying ,  coincides with the ordinal type of  restricted to the countable subset .
 The Takeuti-Feferman-Buchholz ordinal coincides with the ordinal type of  restricted to the recursive subset .
 For any , the well-foundedness of  restricted to the recursive subset  in the sense of the non-existence of a primitive recursive infinite descending sequence is not provable under .
 The well-foundedness of  restricted to the recursive subset in the same sense as above is not provable under .

Normal form 

Here  is a function symbol rather than an actual addition, and  denotes the class of additive principal numbers.

It is also useful to replace the third case by the following one obtained by combining the second condition:

We note that those two formulations are not equivalent. In this way, the notion of normal form heavily depends on the context. In both formulations, every ordinal in  can be uniquely expressed in normal form for Buchholz's function.

References 

Ordinal numbers